Karl Müllner (born 18 February 1956) is a former German air force general. He served as Inspector of the Air Force from 25 April 2012 to 29 May 2018.

Ingo Gerhartz was appointed as his successor.

References 

Living people
1956 births
Place of birth missing (living people)
Lieutenant generals of the German Air Force
German Air Force pilots